35 Comae Berenices is a multiple star system in the northern constellation of Coma Berenices, located about 6° from the north galactic pole. It is faintly visible to the naked eye with an apparent visual magnitude of 4.93. Based upon parallax measurements, it is located around 280 light years from the Sun. The system is moving closer to the Earth with a heliocentric radial velocity of −6 km/s.

This was found to be a wide binary by Struve in 1828, but it has completed less than half an orbit since then and the orbital elements remain poorly constrained.

References

G-type giants
F-type main-sequence stars
4
Coma Berenices
Durchmusterung objects
Comae Berenices, 35
112033
062886
4894